Yablochny is a rural locality (a village) in Udelno-Duvaneysky Selsoviet, Blagoveshchensky District, Bashkortostan, Russia. The population was 12 as of 2010. There are 2 streets.

Geography 
Yablochny is located on the Belaya River, 25 km northwest of Blagoveshchensk (the district's administrative centre) by road. Ilyinsky is the nearest rural locality.

References 

Rural localities in Blagoveshchensky District